Omkar Kapoor is an Indian actor who works in the Bollywood film industry. He began his performing career as a child artist and worked in films like Judwaa, Hero No.1 and Judaai. He made his Bollywood debut as a Parallel Lead actor with his movie Pyaar Ka Punchnama 2.

Early life 
Kapoor started his career with Masoom, where he received immense popularity as a child artist and became the most favourite child artist of that time. Later he got a chance to work with several big stars of the Indian film industry, like Govinda, Anil Kapoor, Urmila Matondkar, Salman Khan and Sridevi.

Career 
Omkar Kapoor assisted Bollywood directors like Sanjay Leela Bhansali, Farah Khan and Ahmed Khan, but he really wanted to be an actor and hence gave many auditions, of which he bagged Pyaar Ka Punchnama 2. In 2017, Kapoor starred as Mithilesh Chaturvedi in the web film U, Me Aur Ghar alongside Simran Kaur Mundi. In 2018, he starred as Ankush Patel aka Maggie in the Viu original series Kaushiki.

In 2019, he starred as Varun Kumar Pandey in the comedy film Jhootha Kahin Ka. Kapoor starred as Purva in the Zee5 web series Bhootpurva. He also played the supporting role in web series Bhram. In 2020, Kapoor played the role of Neel in the Zee5 short film Forbidden Love: Arranged Marriage. In 2021, Kapoor starred as Dr. Abhijit Verma in the MX Player web series Bisaat alongside Sandeepa Dhar, which was directed by Vikram Bhatt.

Filmography

Films

Television

Web series

Music videos

Awards and nominations

References

External links 
 
 

20th-century Indian male actors
21st-century Indian male actors
Indian male film actors
Male actors in Hindi cinema
Living people
Punjabi people
Male actors from Mumbai
1986 births